Georges Colonna Ceccaldi (7 January 1840, Paris -1879) was an antiquities dealer. His brother Tiburce Colonna Ceccaldi was the French consul to Cyprus between 1866-1869. Georges provided various museums with Cypriot antiquities, including the British Museum, the Louvre and in the 1872 he sold 40 artefacts from his collection to the Musée d’Archéologie Nationale. He excavated in the site of Idalion and Athienou. The correspondence of the two brothers with other officials active in antiquities dealing in Cyprus, such as Luigi Palma di Cesnola, was published by Olivier Masson.

Publications 

 Découvertes de Chypre. Revue Archéologique, 21, 23-36 (1870).
Découvertes en Chypre (Suite). Revue Archéologique, 24, 221-228 (1872).
Un sarcophage d'Athienau (Chypre). Revue Archéologique, 29, 22-29 (1875).
La patère d'Idalie. Revue Archéologique, 24, 304-316 (1872).
Monuments antiques de Chypre, de Syrie et d'Égypte. Paris (1882).

References

External links 
Ceccaldi's collection of over 550 objects in the Musée d’Archéologie Nationale.

1840 births
1879 deaths
French antiquarians
French archaeologists